The 1952 VFL Grand Final was an Australian rules football game contested between the Geelong Football Club and Collingwood Football Club, held at the Melbourne Cricket Ground on 27 September 1952. It was the 55th annual Grand Final of the Victorian Football League, staged to determine the premiers for the 1952 VFL season. The match, attended by 81,304 spectators, was won by Geelong by 46 points, marking that club's fifth premiership victory and second in succession.

Teams

{|
|valign="top"|

Umpire - James Jamieson

The game
Geelong entered the game as the hottest favourites in many a year. The Cats were in the middle of their record winning run and had thrashed Collingwood in the Second Semi final. Collingwood entered the grand final with two changes forced by injuries to Lucas and Pat Twomey. In to the side was Les Smith, Harvey Stevens and Keith Batchelor who made his debut at full back.

1st quarter
Collingwood got the first goal of the game from a drop kick from Thorold Merrett. Geelong then got in their stride and kicked the next four goals.

2nd quarter
Parker got Collingwood's only goal of the quarter and there vigor was having a negative effect of the Cats. Geelong finally got a goal in time on to go into the break with a twelve point lead.

3rd quarter
It took until the halfway mark of the third before Geelong finally decided enough was enough and in a blitz added five goals to finish the quarter with a 39 point lead.

4th quarter
With the game out of reach the Magpies attack constantly for little reward, seven behinds from their slow, lumbersome forwards. Geelong on the other hand eased off but still kicked two goals to defeat the Magpies by 46 points.

Statistics

Score

Goalkickers

Geelong:
 Goninon 5, Trezise 4, Davis, Flanagan, McMaster, Worner

Collingwood:
 Parker 3, Merrett 2

Best

Geelong:
 Williams, Goninon, Sharp, Trezise, B. Smith, Morrison, Flanagan, Worner

Collingwood:
 Merrett, Mann, R. Rose, Tuck, M. Twomey, P. Twomey, Dunstan

See also
 1952 VFL season

References
 AFL Tables: 1952 Grand Final
 1952
 The Official statistical history of the AFL 2004 
 Ross, J. (ed), 100 Years of Australian Football 1897-1996: The Complete Story of the AFL, All the Big Stories, All the Great Pictures, All the Champions, Every AFL Season Reported, Viking, (Ringwood), 1996. 

VFL/AFL Grand Finals
Grand
Geelong Football Club
Collingwood Football Club
September 1952 sports events in Australia